Carlos Octavio Castellanos Mijares (born 26 May 1977) is a Mexican politician affiliated with the PVEM. As of 2013 he served as Deputy of the LXII Legislature of the Mexican Congress representing Chiapas replacing Raciel López Salazar.

References

1977 births
Living people
People from Chiapas
21st-century Mexican lawyers
Ecologist Green Party of Mexico politicians
21st-century Mexican politicians
Deputies of the LXII Legislature of Mexico
Members of the Chamber of Deputies (Mexico) for Chiapas